George Henry Nicholson (25 January 1932 – January 2015) was an English professional footballer who played as a goalkeeper in the Football League for Grimsby Town, Nottingham Forest, Accrington Stanley, Leyton Orient and Bristol City.

References

1932 births
2015 deaths
People from Wetheral
English footballers
Association football goalkeepers
Carlisle United F.C. players
Grimsby Town F.C. players
Nottingham Forest F.C. players
Accrington Stanley F.C. players
Leyton Orient F.C. players
Bristol City F.C. players
Poole Town F.C. players
Bath City F.C. players
English Football League players
Footballers from Cumbria